ARRG may refer to:

 Amateur Radio Relay Group, from Portland, Oregon
 Auld Reekie Roller Girls, from Edinburgh in Scotland